Plouffe is a French surname. People with the surname include:

 David Plouffe (born 1967), American campaign manager
 Katherine and Michelle Plouffe (born 1992), Canadian basketball players and twin sisters
 Maeve Plouffe (born 1999), Australian cyclist
 Simon Plouffe (born 1956), Quebec mathematician
 Steve Plouffe (born 1975), Canadian retired ice hockey goaltender
 Trevor Plouffe (born 1986), American baseball player
 La Famille Plouffe, Quebec TV series of the 1950s (and revived in the 1980s)
 The Plouffe Family (film) (French: Les Plouffe), 1981 Canadian drama film

See also
Bailey–Borwein–Plouffe formula, a formula for computing 
The Crime of Ovide Plouffe (French: Le Crime d'Ovide Plouffe), Canadian film and television miniseries from Quebec
L'Abord-à-Plouffe, Quebec in the southwest of the city of Laval
Pouf

French-language surnames